Diaphus impostor, the imposter lanternfish, is a species of lanternfish found in the Western Central Pacific Ocean.

Etymology
The epithet impostor refers to the resemblance of this species to, and the possibility of confusion with, D. aliciae.

References

Myctophidae
Taxa named by Basil Nafpaktitis
Taxa named by Don A. Robertson
Taxa named by John Richard Paxton
Fish described in 1995
Fish of the Pacific Ocean